Intermountain Primary Children's Hospital (PCH) (formerly Primary Children's Medical Center) is a nationally ranked pediatric acute care children's teaching hospital located in Salt Lake City, Utah. The hospital has 289 pediatric beds and is affiliated with the University of Utah School of Medicine. The hospital is a member of Intermountain Healthcare (IHC) and is the only children's hospital in the network. The hospital provides comprehensive pediatric specialties and subspecialties to infants, children, teens, and young adults aged 0–21 throughout the Salt Lake City and outer region. PCH also sometimes treats adults that require pediatric care. PCH is a ACS verified Level 1 Pediatric Trauma Center and is the largest providers of pediatric health services in the state. The hospital serves the states of Utah, Nevada, Idaho, Montana, and Wyoming, yielding an enormous geographic catchment area of approximately 400,000 square miles. The hospital is one of the only pediatric hospitals in the region.

History
PCH had its beginnings in the efforts of the Church of Jesus Christ of Latter-day Saints (LDS Church) to provide adequate medical care to citizens of the Western United States. An LDS organization and building, named "Deseret Hospital", was first founded in 1882 in Salt Lake City, but it closed for financial reasons in 1900.

In 1911, some LDS Church leaders, including May Anderson and Louie B. Felt, pushed for a separate facility geared to needs of infants and young patients.  By 1913, a children's ward had been established at LDS Hospital and by 1922 a separate facility for children was established in a large Salt Lake City house. It was run by the Primary Association (the LDS Church's organization for children), thus the name. During those years, the LDS Church encouraged its members to donate to the hospital's fund by an annual fundraising effort, "Pennies By The Inch", in which members were asked to donate as many pennies as they were tall (in inches).

From 1934 to 1974, the hospital building was referred to as PCH. On February 12, 1952, the hospital moved to a larger building located near the top of the Avenues area of Salt Lake (the hilly portion of northeast Salt Lake City). It was substantially enlarged in 1966, gaining nearly twice its original area.

In 1974, the LDS Church decided to divest itself of the ownership and operation of several of its non-church-related activities such as health-care facilities. As a result, in 1975 its hospitals were turned over to the not-for-profit IHC group, which still owns and operates PCH. The Avenues facility was closed in 1990 and the hospital was moved to a larger facility on the medical campus of the University of Utah. University faculty provide care for patients at PCH, and the University of Utah pediatric residency program and medical school use it as their pediatric training site. The facility was known as Primary Children's Medical Center from 1974 to 2013 until the hospital was renamed to Primary Children's Hospital.

In January, 2020 PCH announced that they are going to build a second hospital in the Lehi region of Utah. The hospital is expected to cost $500 million and provide pediatric emergency care, intensive care, and behavioral health services.

In July 2020 Primary Children's Hospital rolled out a new service for parents and families of babies that were in the neonatal intensive care unit (NICU). The service run by company, AngelEye is able to provide video 24/7 to parents and families when they can't be in the NICU with their child.

On July 4, 2020, members of the Salt Lake City Police Department and surrounding departments brought their police cars to the hospital to perform a light show, "Good Night Lights." The show took place because the children in the hospital would not be able to enjoy the Independence Day firework celebrations.

About

Patient care units 
The hospital has a 32-bed pediatric intensive care unit to treat critically ill infants, children, teens, and young adults and a 50-bed AAP verified Level 4 neonatal intensive care unit to handle critically ill infants.
 35-bed Pediatric Emergency Department
 32-bed PICU
 16-bed CICU
 28-bed Neuro Trauma Unit
 50-bed Level IV NICU
128-beds General Pediatrics

Ronald McDonald House 
Right down the road from Primary Children's Hospital is the Ronald McDonald House of the Intermountain Area. The house was originally established in 1988 and has a capacity of 72 rooms for parents and families of infants, children, teens, and young adults aged 0–21 coming from over 35 miles outside of the area. In addition to the nearby house, Ronald McDonald House of the Intermountain Area has family rooms on floors two and three of Primary Children's Hospital and features "hospitality carts" at nearby Ogden Regional Medical Center and Shriners Salt Lake City.

Utah Valley Hospital 

In addition to their main campus at the University of Utah, doctors from Primary Children's Hospital provide care at the pediatric units at Utah Valley Hospital in Provo, Utah. As both hospitals are members of Intermountain Healthcare, Utah Valley (and other Intermountain hospitals) feed many patients to Primary Children's Hospital.

Awards 
In 2017 Primary Children's Hospital was a semifinalist in the clinical care category of the Children's Hospital Association's annual Pediatric Quality Award.

In 2020–21, PCH has placed nationally in 8 ranked pediatric specialties on U.S. News & World Report. In addition, PCH is ranked as the best children's hospital in Utah.

See also 

 Intermountain Healthcare
 University of Utah School of Medicine
 List of children's hospitals in the United States

References

Further reading

External links 

 

1922 establishments in Utah
Hospital buildings completed in 1952
Hospital buildings completed in 1966
Children's hospitals in the United States
Hospitals in Salt Lake City
History of the Church of Jesus Christ of Latter-day Saints
Intermountain Health
Primary (LDS Church)
Teaching hospitals in Utah
The Church of Jesus Christ of Latter-day Saints in Utah
Buildings and structures at the University of Utah
University and college buildings completed in 1922
Pediatric trauma centers
Hospital buildings completed in 1990